Saga Television Station (株式会社サガテレビ), branded since 2015 as Saga TV, is the only commercial television station broadcasting to Saga. The station is affiliated to FNN and FNS since the station launched.

Despite holding a local monopoly in commercial television to the prefecture, commercial television stations from Fukuoka are easily available.

History
Prior to the opening of the bidding for a new commercial broadcaster in Saga Prefecture, people living in the area tended to listen to radio or watch TV programming with antennas pointing to either Kumamoto or Fukuoka Prefectures, due to the fact that there are no mountains surrounding the nearby mentioned prefectures. There were multiple attempts to request a broadcast license to open a commercial broadcaster in Saga Prefecture, but all were rejected.It wasn't until 1967 that the Ministry of Post included Saga in the UHF allocation. The three companies that initially applied for a license were consolidated into Saga Broadcasting Corporation, and later obtained the license on November 1 of the same year.The company name was later changed to Saga Television Station on May 28, 1968.

Before the broadcaster started its operations, TV sets in Japan were required to have the capability to receive UHF channels. In Saga Prefecture, only 30% of the population had TVs with UHF receivers, which pushed them to promote UHF TVs. The campaign was deemed successful, that 60% already had UHF capable TVs. Since Nishinippon Shimbun had played a role in the founding of Saga TV, the broadcaster then decided to be part of the Fuji News Network, which is funded by the mentioned newspaper and Television Nishinippon Corporation.
April 1, 1969 - STS begins broadcasting on UHF channel 36.
1994 - STS moves their headquarters.
December 1, 2006 - Digital broadcasts begin, the station was assigned to channel 44 and the remote control key is channel 3.
July 24, 2011 - Analog transmissions cease.
January 1, 2015 - The station is rebranded as SAGA TV.

References

External links
 Official website

Fuji News Network
Television stations in Japan
Television channels and stations established in 1969